Un re in ascolto (A King Listens) is an opera by Luciano Berio, who also wrote the Italian libretto. It is based on a short story from the collection Under the Jaguar Sun by Italo Calvino, but incorporates excerpts from Friedrich Einsiedel's 1778 libretto (as reworked by Friedrich Wilhelm Gotter between 1790 and 1791) for an opera based on Shakespeare's The Tempest. This became Die Geisterinsel in 1798, set to music written by Friedrich Fleischmann. In addition, W. H. Auden's The Sea and the Mirror: A Commentary on Shakespeare's The Tempest was a source.

Berio himself described the work as an azione musicale (musical action) rather than an opera. It falls into 19 sections grouped into two parts. The work was written from 1981 to 1983 and it received its premiere at the Kleines Festspielhaus in Salzburg on 7 August 1984, conducted by Lorin Maazel, directed by Götz Friedrich, with set designs by Günther Schneider-Siemssen. The London premiere took place on 9 February 1989 at the Royal Opera House, Covent Garden. The American premiere was at Lyric Opera of Chicago on 9 November 1996, conducted by Dennis Russell Davies.

Roles

Synopsis
The opera does not have a conventional linear narrative.

A king of a mythical kingdom lives detached from his realm where his only contact with his kingdom is through overhearing conversations. A traveling theatrical troupe arrives to stage a performance of The Tempest. As the king overhears the auditions and the rehearsals, he begins to imagine himself as Prospero from the play and he begins to equate these with the happenings in his kingdom, blurring the two worlds. Eventually, he undergoes a psychological collapse, the rehearsed production of The Tempest never occurs, and the theatrical troupe departs. The king has a vision of the future as he moves towards his own death.

Recording
Luciano Berio: Un re in ascolto (Theo Adam, Heinz Zednik, Sylvia Greenberg, Gabriele Sima, Helmut Wildhaber, Patricia Wise, Karan Armstrong, Rohangiz Yachmi, Anna Gonda, Helmuth Lohner; Vienna Philharmonic; Conductor: Lorin Maazel) CD 1999. Label: Col Legno 20005

References
Notes

Sources

Holden, Amanda (Ed.), The New Penguin Opera Guide, New York: Penguin Putnam, 2001. 
The publisher's description — Universal Edition
Wilson, Robert J. (1998), "Shakespeare, William" in Stanley Sadie, (Ed.), The New Grove Dictionary of Opera, Vol. Four. London: Macmillan Publishers, Inc. 1998    

1984 operas
Operas
Operas by Luciano Berio
Adaptations of works by Italo Calvino
Italian-language operas